Murad Naji Hussein (born 12 June 1991) is a Qatari footballer who currently plays for Qatar Stars League side Al-Wakrah. He is a graduate of Qatar's Aspire Academy.

Career

Club career
Murad Naji initially expressed his desire in professional football in France, and has received offers from Olympique de Marseille and AS Nancy. While negotiating his contract renewal with Al Rayyan in May 2012, he asked management for a large increase in salary, claiming that he has offers in Europe. Al Rayyan refused, and he joined Qatar SC on a 2-year deal instead.

International career
Born in Algeria, Naji is of Jordanian descent and moved to Qatar at a young age. He Naji received his first call-up to the Qatar Olympic football team in August 2008 by then coach Hassan Harmutallah.

He has played for the Qatar Olympic team in the GGC U23 tournament held in Qatar on August 2011.

Personal
Murad Naji graduated from Qatar University with a degree in Sports science.

Honours
Al-Rayyan
Emir of Qatar Cup: 2010, 2011

Notes

External links
 goal.com Murad Naji
 hailoosport.com Murad Naji

1991 births
Living people
Qatari footballers
Qatar Stars League players
Al-Rayyan SC players
Qatar SC players
Umm Salal SC players
El Jaish SC players
Al-Duhail SC players
Al-Wakrah SC players
Qatar University alumni
Aspire Academy (Qatar) players
Naturalised citizens of Qatar
Qatari people of Algerian descent
Qatari people of Jordanian descent
Association football fullbacks